China Merchants Property Development Co., Ltd. was established in Shenzhen, China in 1984 and it is the real estate flagship of China Merchants. It offers residential properties in China cities, including Shenzhen, Zhuhai, Zhangzhou, Foshan, Guangzhou, Shanghai, Suzhou, Nanjing, Beijing, Tianjin and Chongqing.

In 2015 it was privatized. However, its direct parent company became a listed company instead.

See also
Real estate in China

References

External links
  

China Merchants
Real estate companies of China
Government-owned companies of China
Companies based in Shenzhen
Chinese companies established in 1984
Real estate companies established in 1984
Companies formerly listed on the Singapore Exchange
Companies formerly listed on the Shenzhen Stock Exchange
1984 establishments in China